Secret Beyond the Door is a 1947 American film noir psychological thriller and a modern updating of the Bluebeard fairytale, directed by Fritz Lang, produced by Lang's Diana Productions, and released by Universal Pictures. The film stars Joan Bennett and was produced by her husband Walter Wanger. The black-and-white film noir drama is about a woman who suspects her new husband, an architect, plans to kill her.

Plot
The behavior of Mark Lamphere, an architect, turns strange shortly after his honeymoon with bride Celia, who begins finding out that Mark has many secrets.

It turns out he was married before, his wife died suspiciously and they have a son. He also has a fiercely loyal secretary, Miss Robey, whose face is disfigured.

Mark appears to be somewhat delusional and could be intending to murder Celia inside a room he keeps locked. The disturbed Miss Robey ends up setting fire to the house, whereupon Mark redeems himself in Celia's eyes by saving her life.

Cast
 Joan Bennett as Celia Lamphere
 Michael Redgrave as Mark Lamphere
 Anne Revere as Caroline Lamphere
 Barbara O'Neil as Miss Robey
 Natalie Schafer as Edith Potter
 Paul Cavanagh as Rick Barrett  
 Anabel Shaw as Intellectual Sub-Deb  
Rosa Rey as Paquita
 James Seay as Bob Dwight  
 Mark Dennis as David Lamphere

Release
The film recorded a loss of $1,145,000.

Secret Beyond the Door was released in the UK on DVD in November 2011 by Exposure Cinema.  Olive Films released the film in the United States on DVD and Blu-ray on September 4, 2012.

Reception
When the film was first released, film critic Bosley Crowther of The New York Times was of mixed opinions: "If you want to be tough about it—okay, it's a pretty silly yarn and it is played in a manner no less fatuous by the sundry members of the cast. But Mr. Lang is still a director who knows how to turn the obvious, such as locked doors and silent chambers and roving spotlights, into strangely tingling stuff. And that's why, for all its psycho-nonsense, this film has some mildly creepy spots and some occasional faint resemblance to Rebecca which it was obviously aimed to imitate." Variety called it arty and almost surrealistic. The motivations of the characters were described as occasionally murky.

Jonathan Rosenbaum of the Chicago Reader called the film's murkiness a strength. Rotten Tomatoes, a review aggregator, reports that 54% of 13 surveyed critics gave the film a positive review; the average rating is 5.5/10.

References

External links
 
 
 
 
 

1947 films
1940s thriller drama films
American thriller drama films
American black-and-white films
Film noir
Films based on fairy tales
Universal Pictures films
Films scored by Miklós Rózsa
Films directed by Fritz Lang
Films produced by Walter Wanger
Films set in Mexico
1947 drama films
1940s English-language films
1940s American films
Films based on Bluebeard